Kaivandur is a village in Tamil Nadu, India. It is located between the town of Thiruvallur and the Thiruthani temple.

TELC Martin Church is situated in Kaivandur. 

Villages in Tiruvallur district